Peyla is an unincorporated community in Vermilion Lake Township, Saint Louis County, Minnesota, United States.

Geography
The community is located four miles west of Tower at the junction of State Highway 169 (MN 169), State Highway 1 (MN 1), and Saint Louis County Road 77 (Angus Road).

History
A post office called Peyla was established in 1907, and remained in operation until 1924. Peter Peyla, an early postmaster, gave the community its name.

References

Unincorporated communities in Minnesota
Unincorporated communities in St. Louis County, Minnesota